Étienne Blanchard (April 1, 1843 – September 25, 1918) was a Canadian politician.

Born in Saint-Jean-Baptiste, Canada East, Blanchard was mayor of Saint-Marc in 1890 and 1891. He was the member of the Legislative Assembly of Quebec for Verchères from 1897 to 1908.

References

1843 births
1918 deaths
Mayors of places in Quebec
People from Montérégie
Quebec Liberal Party MNAs